Geodesy, a short film produced and directed by Tathagata Mukherjee that has been nominated for the Jio Filmfare Short Film Awards 2018.

Plot 
The film is about 'an interview' of two street children on Christmas, who have their own interpretation of the world they live in. These children have their own version of Santa, Jesus, Christmas, new year and of course their own country. On Christmas eve, as happiness, money and desires float on the city's streets, these children happen to find their 'own song of harmony'. The film eventually revels to us the undisturbed co existence of 'differences' in this part of the world.

Screenplay 
The story and screenplay is written by Tathagata Mukherjee and the dialogue is written by Abhirup Bandyopadhyay and Tathagata Mukherjee.

Contribution 
Geodesy is a collaborative work by actor Tathagata Mukherjee, Abira Mazumder who is the production designer and Rahul Halder, the chief assistant director of the film.

Awards and nominations

Music 
The background music has been composed by Mayookh Bhaumik.

References

External links 
 
 Geodesy

Indian short films
Bengali-language Indian films